The 1977 Toyota Tamaraws season was the third season of the franchise in the Philippine Basketball Association (PBA).

Colors
   (dark)
   (light)

Transactions

Summary
The Toyota Tamaraws were the top qualifier in the Group A standings with nine wins and five losses in the All-Filipino Conference. The Tamaraws missed out a finals stint for the first time in seven conferences and settled for a third-place finish via 3–0 sweep off Tanduay.

In the Open Conference, the Tamaraws came up with the best imports seemingly - Bruce "Sky" King and John "Dr.I" Irving. Toyota wound up again with a 9-5 win-loss card after the two-round eliminations. In the semifinal round, Toyota forced a playoff game with arch rival Crispa for the second finals berth following a 104–92 victory, but fell short in the do-or-die game, 87–90. The Tamaraws clinch third place at the expense of Seven-Up.

Toyota came back with a vengeance in the Invitational championship, snapping Crispa's dynastic rule while claiming the league's first three-game title-romp. The visiting Emtex Sacronels (a guest team composed of players from the Brazil national basketball team, including Oscar Schmidt) had a clean seven-game sweep in the elimination round and sealed a titular meeting with the Tamaraws. King and Irving displayed an overwhelming show of power in Toyota's three-game sweep over the Brazilians. The championship was the first for coach Dante Silverio in the third conference.

Roster

References

External links
Sportingpage.blogspot.com

Toyota Super Corollas seasons
Toyota